Théodore André Monod (9 April 1902 – 22 November 2000) was a French naturalist, humanist, scholar and explorer.

Exploration

Monod was educated at École alsacienne and obtained a doctorate in science from Sorbonne University in 1922. Early in his career, Monod was made professor at the Muséum national d'histoire naturelle and founded the Institut fondamental d’Afrique noire in Senegal. He became a member of the Académie des sciences d'outre-mer in 1949, member of the Académie de marine in 1957 and member of the Académie des sciences in 1963. In 1960, he became one of the founders of the World Academy of Art and Science.

He began his career in Africa with the study of monk seals on Mauritania's Cap Blanc peninsula. However, he soon turned his attention to the Sahara desert, which he would survey for more than sixty years in search of meteorites. Though he failed to find the meteorite he sought, he discovered numerous plant species as well as several important Neolithic sites. Perhaps his most important find (together with Wladimir Besnard) was the Asselar man, a 6,000-year-old skeleton of the Adrar des Ifoghas that many scholars believe to be the first remains of a distinctly black person. In the early 1960s he discovered the caravan wreck site at Ma'adin Ijafen.

Private life and activism

Monod, the son of Wilfred Monod, attended the Lycée Pierre Corneille in Rouen. His father was a pastor of l'Oratoire du Louvre, which Theodore also attended. He subsequently became the founding president of the Francophone Unitarian Association (1986-1990), the first openly Unitarian religious organization established in France and later sponsored a spin-off of the AUF known as the Fraternal Assembly of Christian Unitarians.

Monod was also politically active, taking part in pacifist and antinuclear protests until only some months before his death. He wrote several articles and books that adumbrated the emerging environmentalist movement. He described himself as a Christian anarchist.

In 1970, he led an International Committee for the Defence of Ernest Ouandié during his trial. The Cameroonian revolutionary executed on the orders of the regime.

Monod was the great-grandson of Frédéric Monod. He shared a common ancestor with biologist Jacques Monod, the musician Jacques-Louis Monod, the politician Jérôme Monod and director Jean-Luc Godard.

Monod was a strict vegetarian who advocated for animal rights. He never touched alcohol, meat or tobacco. He once walked 600 miles in the Sahara to prove that he had sufficient stamina without eating meat.

Scientific work
The scientific bibliography of Théodore Monod includes more than 700 works on topics from his thesis subject, the Gnathiidae (a family of parasitic Isopoda), to the subject that he held close to his heart until his death: the Scaridae, which he published on in 1994 in collaboration with Canadian research scientist Andrea Bullock.

Monod discovered and gave his name to 30 species of insects and plants, 50 crustaceans and several fish.

Selected works
Works re-edited and released by Actes Sud (Arles):
Méharées, (Paris, 1937), rééd. 1989.
L'Émeraude des garamantes, (éditions de L'Harmattan, Paris, 1984), rééd. 1992.
L'Hippopotame et le philosophe, rééd. 1993.
Désert lybique, éditions Arthaud, 1994.
Majâbat Al-Koubrâ, Actes Sud, 1996.
Maxence au désert, Actes Sud, Arles, 1995.
Tais-toi et marche ..., exploration journal from El Ghallaouya-Aratane-Chinguetti, Actes Sud, 2002.

Awards
1960 Patrons's Medal of the Royal Geographical Society for his work in the Sahara.

Authority name

See also
:Category:Taxa named by Théodore Monod

References
This article began as a translation of the corresponding article at the French Wikipedia, accessed 17 December 2005.

External links 

 Obituary at monachus-guardian.org
 webAfriqa — Théodore Monod, fondateur-directeur de l'IFAN
 Théodore Monod (French language)
 "Un exceptionel naturtaliste eclectique", Autres Temps, 2001, vol. 70 issue 70, pp. 25–38

1902 births
2000 deaths
20th-century French zoologists
Scientists from Rouen
Christian anarchists
Christian humanists
French anarchists
French carcinologists
French Christian pacifists
French explorers
Explorers of Africa
French naturalists
French Protestants
French Unitarians
French vegetarianism activists
Lycée Pierre-Corneille alumni
Members of the French Academy of Sciences
National Museum of Natural History (France) people